Harry MacMillan was a Scottish professional footballer who played in the Scottish League for Hamilton Academical, East Stirlingshire and Clyde as an inside forward.

Career statistics

References

Scottish footballers
Brentford F.C. players
Scottish Football League players
Year of birth missing
Year of death missing
Place of birth missing
Place of death missing
Association football inside forwards
Hamilton Academical F.C. players
Clyde F.C. players
East Stirlingshire F.C. players